One More Happy Ending is a 2016 South Korean television series starring Jang Na-ra, Jung Kyung-ho, Yoo In-na, Kwon Yul and Yoo Da-in. It aired on MBC on Wednesdays and Thursdays at 22:00.

Synopsis
A romantic comedy about a once-popular first generation girl-group, whose members are in their 30s and are living very different lives, and the men they encounter as they fall in love once again.

In the 1990s, Han Mi-mo (Jang Na-ra), Baek Da-jung (Yoo Da-in), Go Dong-mi (Yoo In-na), Hong Ae-ran (Seo In-Young) and Goo Seul-ah (Sandara Park) were once members of the successful idol group "Angels". However, the group struggled internally due to Seul-ah's intolerable attitude and meanness, which was further aggravated by her being the most popular member. Fed up with Seul-ah's selfishness, Mi-mo got into a highly publicized physical fight with her and the group disbanded in 2003.

Retired from show business, the once-divorced Mi-mo now works as a rep for a remarriage consulting business and is expecting to marry her fiancée Jeonghoon. Tragically, Seul-ah rears her head again and Mi-mo is dumped in favor of the popular singer-turned-actress. Her former bandmate Da-jung is also a rep at the same company. She married a rich man, but her marriage is on the rocks. Dong-mi, who was the least popular member in the group, is now an elementary school teacher. Over the years, she has lost her good looks and feels lonely. Ae-ran is a representative for an internet shopping mall. The women are all still friends with the exception of Seul-ah.

Song Soo-hyuk (Jung Kyung-ho) is a reporter and a single father. He has a friend, Goo Hae-joon (Kwon Yul), who is a doctor and single. Song Soo-hyuk and Goo Hae-joon become involved with the women.

Cast

Main
 Jang Na-ra as Han Mi-mo
 Lee Young-eun  as young Han Mi-mo
Co-owner of remarriage consulting agency "Brave Wedding". Former member of girl's idol group "Angels".
 Jung Kyung-ho as Song Soo-hyuk
 Choi Kwon-soo as young Song Soo-hyuk
Reporter/photographer of gossip magazine "Masspunch".
 Yoo In-na as Go Dong-mi
Elementary school teacher. Former member of girl's idol group "Angels".
 Kwon Yul as Goo Hae-joon
Neurologist of "Sarang Hospital". Song Soo-hyuk's best friend.
 Yoo Da-in as Baek Da-jung
Co-owner of remarriage consulting agency "Brave Wedding". Former member of girl's idol group "Angels".
 Seo In-young as Hong Ae-ran
Owner of internet shopping mall. Former member of girl's idol group "Angels".

Supporting
 Kim Tae-hoon as Kim Gun-hak
Baek Da-jung's husband.
 Hwang Sun-hee as Woo Yeon-soo
Ob-gyn doctor of "Sarang Hospital". Goo Hae-joon's ex-wife.
 Park Eun-seok as Bang Dong-bae
Hong Ae-ran's fiancée.
 Ko Kyu-pil as Na Hyun-ki
Reporter/photographer of gossip magazine "Masspunch". 
 Kim Sa-gwon as Kim Seung-jae
Han Mi-mo's ex-husband.
 Lee Chae-eun as Jeong Ah-ni
Reporter of gossip magazine "Masspunch".
 Kim Ji-an as Goo Yeon-mi
High school student. Neurology patient of "Sarang Hospital". 
 Jin Ki-joo as An Soon-soo
Song Soo-hyuk's deceased wife. Song Min-woo's mother.
 Ahn Hyo-seop as Ahn Jung-woo
Go Dong-mi's boyfriend.
 Kim Dan-yul as Song Min-woo
Song Soo-hyuk's son.

Cameo appearances
 Sandara Park as Goo Seul-ah (episode 1)
 Lee Dong-ha as Kim Jung-hoon (episode 1, 5)
 Kim So-yeon as Kim Song-Yool (episode 1)
 Kwak Si-yang as Bang Dae-Han, Kim Song-Yool's ex-husband (episode 1)
 Lee Yeon-doo as Song Min-woo's teacher (episode 2, 6)
 Park Hae-mi as Hong Ae-ran's mother (episode 3)
 Kim Min-jun as Lee Wook (episode 3–8)
 Conan O'Brien as himself (episode 10)

Ratings
In the table below, the blue numbers represent the lowest ratings and the red numbers represent the highest ratings.

International broadcast
 It aired in Vietnam from 17 October 2016 on TV Star SCTV11, under the name Hạnh phúc tìm lại.
It aired in Peru in October 22, 2018 on Willax TV.

References

Korean-language television shows
2016 South Korean television series debuts
2016 South Korean television series endings
MBC TV television dramas
South Korean romantic comedy television series